The Rapperswil Seedamm is the partially artificial causeway and bridge at the most narrow area of Lake Zurich, between Hurden (SZ) and Rapperswil (SG). The Seedamm carries a road and a railway across the lake, with the railway being used by the S5 and S40 lines of the S-Bahn Zürich and by the Südostbahn Voralpen Express.

Geography and location 
The Seedam was built on an ice age moraine located between the three Swiss cantons of Schwyz, St. Gallen and Zürich. This morain forms a peninsula protruding from the south shore of the lake containing the village of Hurden, a small island to the Rapperswil side of the lake, and a section of shallow water dividing Lake Zürich and its upper part, Obersee. To the east of the modern causeway and bridges is the Holzbrücke Rapperswil-Hurden (wooden pedestrian bridge), built in 2001 as a reconstruction of the first bridge between the eastern and western lakesides around 1500 BC. Situated to the southwest, Frauenwinkel is a mire landscape situated around the Seedamm area on the easterly Zürichsee lakeshore between Hurden and Pfäffikon, respectively between the Lützelau and Ufenau islands.

History 

In 1873 the Swiss federal parliament approved the construction of the today's stone causeway and bridge. Construction works began in 1875 and finished in 1878 (in the same year the existing wooden bridge was removed). The construction cost the sum of 1,462,000 Swiss Francs, of which 1,100,000 had been paid by the city of Rapperswil. In 1878 the Zürichsee-Gotthardbahn established the railway line from Rapperswil railway station via Seedamm. In 1939 and 1951 the now called Seedamm causeway was reinforced to meet growing demand. Whilst the bridge sections of the Seedamm allow smaller vessels to pass under them, the main shipping channel between the lower and upper halves of Lake Zürich now passes through the Hurden ship canal, which was cut through the base of the Hurden peninsular in 1942/43, thus placing the village of Hurden on an artificial island. This canal is spanned by the Sternenbrücke, which also carries both road and railway. This causeway was renovated between March and November 2010 to allow 40 tonne trucks to cross the Seedamm.

In 2001 a new wooden footbridge was opened alongside the causeway for the first  of the crossing. It was built in quite the same place as the historical lake bridge linking Rapperswil with the nearby Heilig Hüsli bridge chapel that was built in 1551. For centuries, this connection has been part of the old pilgrimage routes, the so-called Jakobsweg to the Einsiedeln Abbey.

At the beginning of the 21st-century, about 75 passenger trains and 24,000 vehicles crossed the causeway and the town of Rapperswil-Jona every day, and as of 2016, an average of 26,000 vehicles. In order to relieve the traffic on road and rail during rush hours, Rapperswil-Jona is expected to participate as the first Swiss city in a pilot project for so-called Mobility pricing.

Cultural heritage 
Located on Obersee lakeshore at the Seedamm isthmus between the Zürichsee and the Obersee lake area, the area is in close vicinity to the Prehistoric lake crossings, neighboured by four Prehistoric pile dwelling settlements:  Freienbach–Hurden Rosshorn, Freienbach–Hurden Seefeld, Seegubel and Rapperswil-Jona–Technikum.

As well as being part of the 56 Swiss sites of the UNESCO World Heritage Site Prehistoric pile dwellings around the Alps, the settlements are also listed in the Swiss inventory of cultural property of national and regional significance as Class A objects of  national importance.

Literature 
 Geneviève Lüscher:  Brücken und Wege der Bronzezeit. Schweizerischer Nationalfonds. In: Horizonte, März 2005. 
 Beat Eberschweiler: Ur- und frühgeschichtliche Verkehrswege über den Zürichsee: Erste Ergebnisse aus den Taucharchäologischen Untersuchungen beim Seedamm. In: Mitteilungen des Historischen Vereins des Kantons Schwyz, No. 96, Schwyz 2004. 
 Hans Rathgeb: Brücken über den See. Arbeitsgemeinschaft Fussgänger-Holzsteg Rapperswil-Hurden, Rapperswil 2001.

See also 
 Seedamm-Center
 Holzbrücke Rapperswil-Hurden

References

External links 

Buildings and structures in the canton of Schwyz
Buildings and structures in Rapperswil-Jona
Tourist attractions in Rapperswil-Jona
Buildings and structures in the canton of Zürich
Causeways in Europe
Cultural property of national significance in the canton of St. Gallen
Cultural property of national significance in the canton of Schwyz
Geography of Switzerland
Lake Zurich
Railway bridges in Switzerland
Road bridges in Switzerland
Transport in Switzerland
Schwyz–St. Gallen border
Freienbach